Serme was a town of the Chalcidice in ancient Macedonia. It belonged to the Delian League since it appears in the tribute records of Athens between 450/49 and 432/1 BCE, where it paid a phoros of 500 drachmas, as well as in a tribute decree of 422/1 BCE. 

Its site is unlocated.

References

Populated places in ancient Macedonia
Former populated places in Greece
Geography of ancient Chalcidice
Members of the Delian League
Lost ancient cities and towns